Neopsoromopsis is a genus of lichen-forming fungi of uncertain familial placement in the order Lecanorales. The genus is monotypic, containing the single species Neopsoromopsis argentina, found in Argentina. Both the genus and species were described by Hungarian lichenologist Vilmos Kőfaragó-Gyelnik in 1940.

References

Lecanorales
Lecanorales genera
Lichen genera
Monotypic Lecanoromycetes genera
Taxa described in 1940
Taxa named by Vilmos Kőfaragó-Gyelnik